Katherine Vig is an American orthodontist who is the first woman to receive the Albert H. Ketcham Award in Orthodontics in 2009 in the award's 80-year history. Vig is also the past president of American Cleft Palate-Craniofacial Association.

Life
She received her dental degree from Dundee Dental School at the University of St Andrews, Scotland. She then did her orthodontic training at Eastman Dental Hospital, London, where she worked for 10 years after her completion of degree. In 1976, she moved to the United States and started teaching at the Orthodontic department at University of North Carolina School of Dentistry. In 1984, she then moved to University of Michigan School of Dentistry, where she was an associated professor in the department of Orthodontics. In 1990, she moved to University of Pittsburgh School of Dental Medicine and became the chair of the Department of Orthodontics and Associate Director of the Cleft Palate-Craniofacial Center. In 1994, she moved to Ohio State University College of Dentistry  and became the chair of their Division of Orthodontics. She currently serves as an external examiner for the National University of Singapore Dental Schools' orthodontic Program.

Orthodontics
Vig has worked with craniofacial anomalies, where she has treated children with cleft lip/palate and craniofacial birth defects. Vig currently serves as one of the reviewers for the American Journal of Orthodontics, Cleft-Palate-Craniofacial Journal and British Journal of Orthodontics. Vig has published over 100 scientific articles and has co-authored 3 textbooks. The most recent published textbook is Facial Clefts and Craniosynostosis in 1996.

Positions and awards
 American Cleft Palate/Craniofacial Association - Past President
 University of Pittsburgh Department of Orthodontics - Chair
 University of Pittsburgh Cleft Palate-Craniofacial Center - Associate Director
 University of Ohio State Department of Orthodontics  - Chair 
 Academy of Finland's International Task Force - Member
 International Association for Dental Research Craniofacial Biology Group - President
 Albert H. Ketcham Award - First Woman in 82 years to receive the award
 Professor Emeritus at Ohio State University's Division of Orthodontics
 Evidence-based Orthodontics - Co-Editor
 ADA Critical Review Panel of Evidence-based Dentistry - Board Member
 American Board of Orthodontics - Diplomate

See also 
 Failure of eruption of teeth

References

American dentists
Orthodontists
University of Michigan faculty
Living people
Year of birth missing (living people)